Claudia Cron is an American actress and model who, while attending Parson's School of Design was discovered by Eileen Ford and signed to Ford Models. She appeared in Vogue, and from 1979–1986 was under contract with Estee Lauder as the face of their line, Prescriptives. Claudia has had many covers and been photographed for Vogue, Harper's Bazaar, Brides, French Vogue, Glamour, Grazia, Mademoiselle, Modern Bride, Redbook, Self, Votre Beauté, and Working Woman. Photographers Claudia Cron has worked with include Bruce Weber, Victor Skrebneski, Arthur Elgort, Patrick DeMarchalier, Irving Penn, and Albert Watson.

Cron also acted, appearing in notable films such as Stir Crazy and Diner, as well as Soup for One, Running Brave and Aspen Extreme. She guest starred on several television shows including L.A. Law, Hill Street Blues, Cheers, Remington Steele, and Magnum P.I.. Additionally, Claudia acted in many movies for television such as Obsessed with a Married Woman with Tim Matheson and Sunday Drive with Tony Randall and Carrie Fisher.

References

External links
 

Living people
American film actresses
American female models
Parsons School of Design alumni
Year of birth missing (living people)
Place of birth missing (living people)
20th-century American actresses
American television actresses
21st-century American women